Femke is a Dutch feminine given name of West Frisian origin. Rare before 1960, its popularity peaked around 1980 and again around 2000. It is a diminutive of Femme or Fem, which rare forms increased in popularity in the 2010s. People with the name include:

Femke Aan (born 1996), Dutch waterpolo and scientist
Femke Beuling (born 1999), Dutch speed skater
Femke Boelen (born 1968), Dutch rower
Femke Bol (born 2000), Dutch Olympic medal winning athlete
Femke Dekker (born 1979), Dutch rower
Femke Halsema (born 1966), Dutch politician
Femke Heemskerk (born 1987), Dutch swimmer
Femke Hiemstra (born 1974), Dutch painter
Femke Kooijman (born 1978), Dutch field hockey player
Femke Maes (born 1980), Belgian footballer
Femke Meines (born 2000), Dutch singer
Femke Pluim (born 1994), Dutch pole vaulter
Femke Stoltenborg (born 1991), Dutch volleyball player
Femke Van den Driessche (born 1996), Belgian cyclist
Femke van Velzen (born 1980), Dutch documentary filmmaker
Femke Verschueren (born 2000), Belgian singer
Femke Wolting (born 1970), Dutch independent new media producer

References

Dutch feminine given names